The anthem for the Portuguesa State, Venezuela, was composed by Fernando Eduardo Delgado; the musical part was done by Jesús Alvarado.

Lyrics in Spanish Language
Chorus 
Loor al pueblo que el cruel vasallaje 
del Ibérico León combatió,
castigando los ruines ultrajes 
a la patria su vida ofrendó.

I 
Hasta el confín lejano 
de la extensa llanura 
asombra tu bravura,
tu arrojo, tu valor.

Resuelto, noble, leal 
luchando hasta morir,
prefiere sucumbir 
altivo y con honor.

II 
Mimado por la gloria 
propicio a la fortuna, 
fuiste de Páez la cuna, 
de Unda, Castejón. 

Héroes que en la contienda, 
con ínclitas proezas 
borraron las vilezas 
del yugo y la opresión.

Grandioso es el recuerdo 
que dejas en la historia, 
sagrada es tu memoria 
en nuestro corazón. 

III 
Es tu suelo fecundo 
la sangre generosa 
se derramó copiosa 
con valor y lealtad. 

Araure lo pregona: 
el "Batallón sin Nombre" 
adquiere allí su nombre, 
bandera y dignidad. 
 
IV 
Bajo el cielo esplendente 
que a tus selvas corona, 
la esmeraldina zona 
de sombra se cubrió. 

Fue cruento el sacrificio, 
más en recia pujanza 
al golpe de la lanza 
la tiranía se hundió. 

Y siempre los tiranos 
verán en tú diadema 
como fúlgido lema: 
"Atrás la usurpación"

See also
 List of anthems of Venezuela

References

Anthems of Venezuela
Spanish-language songs